Niamat Khel is a Yusufzai subtribe. They are mainly found in 'Galoch', 'Sirsiani' 'Kanju', 'Aligrama', 'Hazara', and 'Gul Jaba' villages of Swat, Pakistan.

Yusufzai Pashtun tribes